The 1932 San Jose State Spartans football team represented State Teachers College at San Jose during the 1932 college football season.

San Jose State competed in the Far Western Conference (FWC). The team was led by first-year head coach Dudley DeGroot, and they played home games at Spartan Field in San Jose, California. The team finished the season undefeated and as co-champions of the FWC with a record of seven wins, no losses and two ties (7–0–2, 3–0–2 FWC). The Spartans outscored their opponents 116–27 for the season, with no team scoring more than a touchdown against the Spartans.

Schedule

Notes

References

San Jose State
San Jose State Spartans football seasons
Northern California Athletic Conference football champion seasons
College football undefeated seasons
San Jose State Spartans football